Halflife is the second EP by Italian gothic metal band Lacuna Coil, released in 2000 by Century Media. The EP contains 5 tracks. A slightly altered version of the track Senzafine would later appear on international releases of their 2001 full-length album, Unleashed Memories, while the entire HALFLife EP was appended to the United States release of the album. A performance of Senzafine can also be found on the band's 2008 live album.

Track listing

Personnel

Band members
 Cristina Scabbia - vocals
 Andrea Ferro - vocals and grunts
 Marco Biazzi - guitar
 Cristiano Migliore - guitar
 Marco Coti Zelati - bass, keyboards, programming, design, layout design
 Cristiano Mozzati - percussion, drums, programming

Production
 Waldemar Sorychta - producer, engineer, mixing
 Dario Mollo - engineer
 Carsten Drescher - layout design
 Volker Beushausen - photography

References

Lacuna Coil albums
2000 EPs
Century Media Records EPs
Albums produced by Waldemar Sorychta